Richard III is a 2007 crime drama film written and directed by Scott M. Anderson, set in contemporary Hollywood as a modern-day retelling of William Shakespeare's Richard III.

Filming took place over a three-week period in 2005, with post-production taking place during 2006. The film's world premiere was April 27, 2007 at World Fest Houston, where it won Platinum Awards for "First Feature Film" for Scott Anderson and "Best Film Score" for Penka Kouneva.

Plot

Cast

 David Carradine as Henry Stafford, 2nd Duke of Buckingham
 Sally Kirkland as Queen Margaret
 María Conchita Alonso as Queen Elizabeth
 Scott M. Anderson as Richard III
 Anne Jeffreys as Duchess of York
 Richard Tyson as George, Duke of Clarence
 Sung Hi Lee as Anne Neville
 Natalie Burn as Natasha 
 Marco Sanchez as Richmond
 Mike Muscat as Archbishop
 Daniela Melgoza as Princess Elizabeth
 Steven Williams as Lord Stanley
 Navid Negahban as Sir James Tyrrel
 Jennifer Sciole as Margaret
 Miranda Kwok as Portia
 Danny Trejo as Major
 Annie Little as Herbert
 Tim Storms as Lord Norfolk
 Tyson Sullivan as York Subordinate
 Dee Mas  as The York Subordinate and Silloette Fighter/Dancer
 Tammy Barr as Noble daughter
 Luca Bercovici as Brackenbury
 Kathleen Davis as Club Goer
 Vincent De Paul as Lancaster FBI Guard
 Oliver Goodwill as York Subordinate
 Kym Jackson as Dukes Escort
 Peter Jason as Ringside Announcer
 TQ as DJ
 Bruno Oliver as The Keeper

Reception
In 2007 it won Platinum Awards for 'First Feature Film' for Scott Anderson and 'Best Film Score' for Penka Kouneva at the 40th Worldfest Independent Film Festival

See also
 Richard III
 Shakespeare on screen

References

External links
 

2007 films
Modern adaptations of works by William Shakespeare
Films based on Richard III (play)
Films set in Los Angeles
2007 crime drama films
American crime drama films
2000s English-language films
2000s American films